Dan Middleman (born October 19, 1969) is an American long-distance runner. He competed in the men's 10,000 metres at the 1996 Summer Olympics.

He competed in the 1997 Maccabiah Games, in Israel.

References

External links
 

1969 births
Living people
Athletes (track and field) at the 1996 Summer Olympics
American male long-distance runners
Olympic track and field athletes of the United States
Place of birth missing (living people)
Competitors at the 1997 Maccabiah Games
Maccabiah Games competitors for the United States
Maccabiah Games athletes (track and field)
20th-century American people